Pyr may refer to:

Pyr (Encantadia), a character in the Encantadia franchise
Pyr (publisher)
Pyridine
Pyridoxine, vitamin B6
Pyrrolidonyl-β-naphthylamide, used in microbiology to distinguish certain Streptococcal organisms
Pyruvic acid
Saint Pyr
Caldey Island, called "Ynys Pyr" in Welsh
 Andravida airbase (IATA: PYR)